Timothy J. Kennedy (born April 30, 1986) is an American former professional ice hockey forward, who played in the National Hockey League (NHL) with the Buffalo Sabres, Florida Panthers, San Jose Sharks and the Phoenix Coyotes.

Playing career

Amateur
Kennedy played several years of his youth career with the Buffalo Regals, where he led the team with future Michigan State University teammate Chris Mueller. He also attended Bishop Timon - St. Jude High School. He played for several years on the Western Division's hockey team in the Empire State Games where his teams won gold in 2002 and 2003. In 2003, Kennedy was offered a contract with the Ontario Hockey League, but declined because he would have been unable to play NCAA college hockey. He was later drafted by the Sioux City Musketeers, a team in the United States Hockey League. Kennedy was actively recruited by major college hockey programs including Colorado College, Ohio State, and Boston College, ultimately accepting a scholarship to Michigan State, where he was a member of 2007 NCAA Championship team. He contributed one goal in the championship game against Boston College and assisted Justin Abdelkader's game-winning goal.

Professional
Kennedy was drafted in the sixth round, 181st overall, in the 2005 NHL Entry Draft by the Washington Capitals but was traded to the Buffalo Sabres the same day in exchange for Buffalo's sixth-round draft pick in 2006 (Mathieu Perreault).

On June 1, 2008, Kennedy signed a two-year entry-level contract with the Sabres. He spent the beginning of the 2008–09 season playing for the Portland Pirates of the American Hockey League (AHL). On December 27, 2008, the Sabres called him up from Portland, giving him the opportunity to play his first NHL game in his hometown in Buffalo. The game was a shoot-out win over the New York Islanders.

Kennedy played the entire 2009–10 season in Buffalo, scoring 10 goals and 16 assists, for  26 total points in 78 games in the regular season, plus 1 goal and 2 assists in 6 playoff games. Kennedy's entry-level contract expired at the end of the season, resulting in a contract dispute with the Sabres. In arbitration, Kennedy was awarded a $1,000,000 contract. On August 2, the Sabres waived Kennedy. Kennedy cleared waivers the next day, at which point Buffalo bought out Kennedy's contract for $333,333. The reported monetary difference between Kennedy's request and the Sabres' contract offer before arbitration was $50,000.

On August 30, 2010, Kennedy signed a one-year contract with the New York Rangers for a reported $550,000. At the start of the season and no room on the Rangers roster, Kennedy was waived again, on October 5, and was then sent to the Rangers' AHL affiliate, the Hartford Wolf Pack, on October 13. On February 26, 2011, Kennedy was traded by the Rangers along with a third round pick to the Florida Panthers in exchange for Bryan McCabe.

On January 26, 2012, he was traded  by Florida to the San Jose Sharks in exchange for Sean Sullivan.

The following year, on July 11, 2013, Kennedy signed as a free agent to a one-year, two-way deal with the Phoenix Coyotes. In the 2013–14 season, Kennedy appeared in 37 games for the Coyotes, his most in the NHL since 2010. As a depth forward, he contributed from the lower lines with 2 goals and 8 points.

On July 3, 2014, Kennedy continued his journeyman career by signing a one-year, two-way deal with the Washington Capitals, his original draft team. He was assigned to their AHL affiliate, the Hershey Bears for the duration of the 2014–15 season, featuring in the AHL All-Star game and posting 59 points in 75 games.

On June 3, 2015, Kennedy signed a one-year contract with Russian club, HC Neftekhimik Nizhnekamsk of the Kontinental Hockey League (KHL) for the 2015–16 season. Kennedy described the experience in Nizhnekamsk as a poor fit for him; he was unable to adapt to the coaching regimen and the city's strict military environment, which prevented him from bringing his family to Russia, and partway through the 2015–16 KHL season, the club bought out his contract. He finished the season playing for Helsinki-based Jokerit, which he considered a much more pleasant experience; he intended to return to North America for the 2016–17 season, most likely in the AHL, but eventually moved to Sweden, signing a one-year deal with Luleå HF of the Swedish Hockey League (SHL) on July 21, 2016. On December 15, 2016, he parted ways with the club, due to a combination of injuries and the birth of his son back in the United States. He was released from his contract in December 2016 and was claimed on waivers by the Charlotte Checkers of the AHL. The Checkers, after conversing with Kennedy, then dropped their claim and allowed Kennedy to sign with the Rochester Americans, allowing him to be closer to his family.

On October 5, 2017, after a successful try-out Kennedy was signed to a one-year AHL contract with the Binghamton Devils for the 2017–18 season.

International play
Tim Kennedy was named to the Team USA roster for the 2010 World Championships in Germany. Team USA finished 13th out of 16 teams, with Kennedy scoring one goal and no assists in six games.

Career statistics

Regular season and playoffs

International

Awards and honors

References

External links

1986 births
Living people
American men's ice hockey left wingers
Binghamton Devils players
Buffalo Sabres players
Connecticut Whale (AHL) players
Florida Panthers players
Hartford Wolf Pack players
Hershey Bears players
Ice hockey people from Buffalo, New York
Jokerit players
Luleå HF players
Michigan State Spartans men's ice hockey players
HC Neftekhimik Nizhnekamsk players
Phoenix Coyotes players
Portland Pirates players
Rochester Americans players
San Antonio Rampage players
San Jose Sharks players
Sioux City Musketeers players
Washington Capitals draft picks
Worcester Sharks players